Baek Do-seon (born 13 April 1930) is a South Korean boxer. He competed in the men's lightweight event at the 1956 Summer Olympics.

References

External links

1930 births
Possibly living people
South Korean male boxers
Olympic boxers of South Korea
Boxers at the 1956 Summer Olympics
Place of birth missing (living people)
Lightweight boxers